NHI may refer to:
 National Health Index (NHI) Number, a unique identifier used in the New Zealand health system
 National Health Insurance, or a specific national scheme:
National Health Insurance (British Virgin Islands)
 National Health Insurance Scheme (Ghana)
 National Health Insurance (Japan) 
 National Health Insurance Scheme (Nigeria)
National Health Insurance (Taiwan)全民健康保險（chuan min chien kang pao hsien)
 National Hispanic Institute, a think-tank focused on the leadership development of young Latinos
 National Historical Institute, in the Philippines
 Nederlandse Helikopter Industrie, a Dutch manufacturer of helicopters
 New Horizon Interactive, a video games company, which has developed the popular Club Penguin MMOG
 NHIndustries, a manufacturer of helicopters
 Nourishing Herbal Infusion
 No humans involved, a dehumanising police term for crimes committed against those with criminal records, such as prostitutes, drug addicts, and transients